Deer Hunter or variants can refer to:

Deer hunting, the hunting of deer
The Deer Hunter, a 1978 film which won the Academy Award for Best Picture
 The Deer Hunter (novel), a 1979 novelization of the screenplay of the film
 Deer Hunter (series), a series of hunting video games
 The Dear Hunter, a band from Boston, Massachusetts
 "The Deer Hunter" (The Blacklist), a 2015 episode of the TV series The Blacklist
 Deerhunter (band), an indie rock band from Atlanta